Oliver Solberg (born 23 September 2001) is a Swedish-Norwegian rally driver. He is the son of the 2003 World Rally Champion, Petter Solberg, and Swedish mother Pernilla Walfridsson, who is also a successful former rally driver. After winning multiple crosskarting championships in his early years, Solberg became the 2018 RallyX Nordic Champion and 2019 FIA ERC1 Junior Champion before following in his father's footsteps and entering the World Rally Championship.

In 2022 he competed as the third driver for Hyundai Motorsport, driving the new Rally1 car at the top level of the sport.

Early life
Solberg was introduced to the world of the WRC before his first birthday when he attended the 2002 Cyprus Rally to watch his father compete. Though a career in motorsport wasn't inevitable, as both his parents encouraged him to try football, ice hockey and many other activities, he had decided motorsport was what he wanted to do. By the age of eight he was competing in crosskarting, winning his first ever race. Over the next years he won multiple Norwegian and Nordic Crosskart Championships.

Rally career
Solberg started his professional rally career in 2017 at 15 years old. Given his young age, one of the few places he was allowed to compete was the Latvian Rally Championship, though he was still too young to drive the road sections which resulted in him and his co-driver Veronica Engan swapping seats between stages. His first rally was Rally Alūksne in a Peugeot 208 R2 where he finished 2nd in his class. He finished the year with 2 wins. Solberg competed in his second season of the Latvian Rally Championship in 2018, where he finished 2nd in both the LRC3 and U28 categories behind European champion Martin Sesks.

After two years competing in the Latvian Rally Championship in the R2 class, Solberg stepped into R5 machinery for the 2019 season. He won 5 consecutive rallies, ultimately winning the Latvian Rally Championship in the Volkswagen Polo GTI R5. One of the rounds of the championship, Rally Liepāja, also counted for the European Rally Championship, meaning he won on his ERC debut against top-level international competition. He also drove six rounds of the American Rally Championship in a Subaru WRX STI, with a livery based on his father's iconic blue and gold WRC Championship-winning car. He claimed victory on only his second outing at the Olympus Rally, and achieved a total of 3 victories in 6 races in the 2019 ARA season.

Solberg made his WRC debut at the end of the season at 2019 Wales Rally GB in a Volkswagen Polo GTI R5, showing stage-winning pace but ultimately retiring from the rally. The same rally also marked his father's last WRC event as he signed off with a WRC2 class victory.

After making his WRC debut at the end of 2019, Solberg stepped up into a full WRC campaign in 2020 driving his own VW Polo R5, and also a partial campaign with Škoda Motorsport. The COVID-19 pandemic paused rallying for some time, but as the sport returned, he won the Rally Sweden Lockdown before heading into the FIA ERC and scoring a podium on his full tarmac debut before winning Rally Liepaja for the second year running. When the WRC restarted, Solberg scored his first WRC class win with a WRC3 victory at Rally Estonia. He followed it up with taking home the 2020 FIA ERC1 Junior Championship title.

For 2021 Solberg joined the reigning WRC champions, Hyundai Motorsport, with a plan to drive the full WRC-2 season. However, after his debut for the team at the 2021 Monte Carlo Rally driving the Hyundai i20 R5, he was unexpectedly offered the chance to make his top-level WRC debut in the Hyundai i20 Coupe WRC at the second round of the season, Arctic Rally Finland. He went on to finish 7th overall with several top 4 stage times. After a series of bad luck through the middle of the year while driving in the WRC2 class, Solberg ended the 2021 season back in the World Rally Car and finished fifth at the 2021 Rally Monza.

2022 saw Solberg return to Hyundai Motorsport's top-level team, driving as the third driver on selected events throughout the season. He shared the seat with Dani Sordo, with a best finish of 4th at Ypres Rally.

On October 6, 2022, it was announced that Solberg and Hyundai Motorsport would part ways at the end of the season at the end of the contract.

Rallycross career

Alongside his rallying commitments, Solberg also entered the RallyX Nordic Championship in 2017, driving his father's 600bhp FIA World Rallycross Championship-winning DS3. His father had jokingly promised that Solberg could drive the car if he could get all the licences and agreements in place, assuming that it wouldn't be possible given his young age. However, Solberg managed to get things in place in time for the season start. Solberg finished on the podium on his debut, and after winning two events in 2017 he ended the season 2nd in the championship.

Solberg returned to the RallyX Nordic Championship in 2018, taking the Championship title with 3 overall wins.

In 2020 Solberg made a one-off return to rallycross, driving the DS3 in the All-Star Magic Weekend at Höljes – an event aimed to bring motorsport to people around the world online during the COVID-19 pandemic. He finished 3rd behind World RX drivers Johan Kristoffersson and Robin Larsson. The 'one-off' return became a 'two-off' after he took part in the Euro RX round at Höljes, winning on track ahead of Anton Marklund and Johan Kristoffersson, but later being controversially disqualified for an overweight car.

Personal life
Oliver Solberg is the son of the 2003 World Rally Champion Petter Solberg and former rally driver Pernilla Solberg. His uncle Henning Solberg, cousin Oscar Solberg and grandparents are or have been well-known motorsport competitors. He lives in Mitandersfors, Sweden.

Solberg's 2018 RallyX Nordic title success, as well as his rally career so far and personal journey, was the subject of the 2019 film Born2Drive which was released in cinemas across Norway. Solberg and his family also feature in the Discovery+ and TVNorge series, Team Solberg. Season 1 was released in 2020, and Season 2 was released in 2022.

Rally victories

ERC victories

WRC3 victories

Rally record

WRC results

* Season still in progress.

WRC-2 results

* Season still in progress.

WRC3 results

ERC results

* Season still in progress.

Notes

References

External links

 
 Oliver Solberg's e-wrc profile

2001 births
Living people
European Rally Championship drivers
Swedish people of Norwegian descent
Swedish rally drivers
World Rally Championship drivers
Sportspeople from Fredrikstad
Hyundai Motorsport drivers